Kudrinskaya is a rural locality (a village) in Verkhovskoye Rural Settlement, Verkhovazhsky District, Vologda Oblast, Russia. The population was 48 as of 2002.

Geography 
Kudrinskaya is located 31 km southwest of Verkhovazhye (the district's administrative centre) by road. Priluk is the nearest rural locality.

References 

Rural localities in Verkhovazhsky District